Gammell is a surname. Notable people with the surname include:

 Bill Gammell (born 1952), Scottish sportsman and industrialist
 James Gammell (1892–1975), British Army officer
 R. H. Ives Gammell (1893–1981), American muralist, portrait painter, art teacher, and writer on art
 Ray Gammell, Irish businessman
 Robin Gammell (born 1936), Canadian film, television and stage actor
 Stephen Gammell (born 1943), American illustrator of children's books